Daily News Live was a live, sports oriented, talk show that aired from 1997 to 2013 on Comcast SportsNet Philadelphia (now NBC Sports Philadelphia).  The show, which was broadcast weeknights from 5:00 to 6:00PM ET, featured host Michael Barkann who was joined by a rotating panel of writers from the Philadelphia Daily News along with athletes and sports experts from around the country for a roundtable discussion about the top sports stories from both the city and the nation.

On game days, guest interviewers would also participate to discuss the night's big game. Viewers were invited to e-mail the show and suggest questions or topics to be discussed on air. Originally, viewers could call in, but that portion of the program was cut by producers.

The show debuted on October 1, 1997 with Michael Barkann, Bill Conlin, Les Bowen, and Jack L. Williams, chairman of Comcast SportsNet.

The success of Daily News Live resulted in the development of similar shows in other Comcast SportsNet sister stations.  These include Chicago Tribune Live on Comcast SportsNet Chicago, Chronicle Live on CSN Bay Area, Daily News Live on SportsNet New York, and Washington Post Live on Comcast SportsNet Mid-Atlantic.

Daily News Live aired for the final time on April 4, 2013, following almost 16 years. The program was replaced with Philly Sports Talk the following Monday (April 8).

Set
The original set was simplistic in nature with the panel sitting around a small coffee table.  The current set includes a long table that the panel sit at, including many large plasma TVs, displaying topics and videos centered around the discussion. On December 23, 2010, the show was temporarily moved to a different studio while the DNL set was gutted. The show returned to its regular studio on January 10, 2011 when a new set was debuted.

On the night of a big game, the show will air live on remote from the spot of the night's event. For the Flyers, the show will air from the AT&T Pavilion located inside the Wells Fargo Center, for Phillies the show airs from the Diamond Club at Citizens Bank Park, for Sixers the show airs courtside, on the baseline of the Wells Fargo Center floor and on the rare occasion that the Eagles play a weeknight game, DNL will often air from a platform in the parking lot or from the Headhouse Plaza inside Lincoln Financial Field.

Controversy
In June 2008, newly inducted Baseball Hall of Fame sportswriter Bill Conlin drew the ire of many viewers when he made questionable comments with racial implications after an e-mail regarding a question posed to coach Andy Reid about then Eagles quarterback Donovan McNabb's shoulder injury was read aloud by host Michael Barkann. The question from Raul was: "Are you serious? It was a stupid question. It's tendinitis. Way to go Philly media. You guys do a great job over-analyzing everything." Conlin turned to Barkann and said, "surprising that guy would leave the blueberry harvest to send that off." Barkann laughed and then said "don't insult the blueberry harvest, mister."

Stephanie Smith, then president of SportsNet, suspended Conlin "pending further review" and neither he nor Barkann appeared on the next day's broadcast. Fill-in host Neil Hartman read a statement from Conlin who claimed there were no racial connotations connected with his comment. Smith has since been moved to a different department and Conlin has yet to return to the show, though Barkann has made it clear that he is welcome any time.

There was an incident between famously controversial DN columnist Marcus Hayes and Barkann on November 18, 2005 when Hayes hounded NFL Films producer Greg Cossell, who was in studio to break down film. Eventually, Barkann intervened, essentially accusing Hayes of being a know-it-all and asking why he always wanted to control the whole show. Barkann accused Hayes of making the show "no fun." He later said that they were not debating "Afghanistan and Iraq". Hayes kept saying things like "Okay, dad, tell me what I need to know. Teach me." He also said this would be "the last time [Barkann] will have to worry about it." Hayes is still a regular guest of the show, though for a time he was mysteriously matched up with days Barkann did not host. In more recent years Barkann and Hayes have been back on together and exhibited no ill-will publicly.

Christmas Eve Episode
DNL is famous for its annual Christmas Eve episode, hosted by Neil Hartman featuring highly controversial, but beloved former Temple Men's Basketball coach John Chaney, and Daily News columnists Dick Jerardi and Mike Kern.

Awards
2002 Mid-Atlantic Emmy Nominee, Outstanding Talk Program/Series
2003 Mid-Atlantic Emmy Nominee, Outstanding Talk Program/Series
2004 Mid-Atlantic Emmy Nominee, OUTSTANDING TALK PROGRAM/SERIES
2006 Mid-Atlantic Emmy Recipient, Interview/Discussion – Series

References

External links
Comcast SportsNet Philadelphia
Daily News Live homepage

1997 American television series debuts
Local sports television programming in the United States
Television articles with incorrect naming style
Comcast SportsNet original programming